The Dowe Historic District is a  historic district in Montgomery, Alabama.  It includes 320 and 334 Washington Avenue and 114–116 South Hull Street. The architectural style of the four contributing buildings ranges from Greek Revival to Queen Anne.  The district was placed on the National Register of Historic Places on December 29, 1988.

References

National Register of Historic Places in Montgomery, Alabama
Historic districts in Montgomery, Alabama
Queen Anne architecture in Alabama
Greek Revival architecture in Alabama
Historic districts on the National Register of Historic Places in Alabama